Osvaldo Gabriel Arroyo (born 27 February 1995) is an Argentine footballer who plays as a left-back for Sportivo Belgrano.

Career
Arroyo's first senior career club were Argentine Primera División team Colón. His debut came in the league on 12 July 2015 in a 0–0 draw with Nueva Chicago. Four more appearances arrived in 2015, prior to zero in 2016 and one in 2016–17 before leaving Colón in July 2017. Ahead of 2018, Arroyo joined Campeonato Brasileiro Série D side Cianorte; becoming the club's first foreign player. After nine appearances in alternative competition, Arroyo made his Série D bow on 14 May versus Novo Hamburgo. In July, he was loaned by Campeonato Brasileiro Série A's Vitória. He returned to his parent team in April 2019 after three games.

In January 2020, Arroyo headed to the Torneo Regional Federal Amateur with Club Atlético San Jorge. Midway through the year, in October, Arroyo signed for divisional rivals 9 de Julio. In February 2021, Torneo Federal A's Sportivo Belgrano became Arroyo's sixth senior club.

Career statistics
.

References

External links

1995 births
Living people
People from Vera Department
Argentine footballers
Association football defenders
Argentine expatriate footballers
Expatriate footballers in Brazil
Argentine expatriate sportspeople in Brazil
Argentine Primera División players
Campeonato Brasileiro Série D players
Club Atlético Colón footballers
Cianorte Futebol Clube players
Esporte Clube Vitória players
9 de Julio de Rafaela players
Sportivo Belgrano footballers
Sportspeople from Santa Fe Province